In mathematics, the Carlitz–Wan conjecture classifies the possible degrees of exceptional polynomials over a finite field Fq of q elements. A polynomial f(x) in Fq[x] of degree d is called exceptional over Fq if every irreducible factor (differing from x − y) or (f(x) − f(y))/(x − y)) over Fq becomes reducible over the algebraic closure of Fq. If q > d4, then f(x) is exceptional if and only if f(x) is a permutation polynomial over Fq.

The Carlitz–Wan conjecture states that there are no exceptional polynomials of degree d over Fq if gcd(d, q − 1) > 1.

In the special case that q is odd and d is even, this conjecture was proposed by Leonard Carlitz (1966) and proved by Fried, Guralnick, and Saxl (1993). The general form of the Carlitz–Wan conjecture was proposed by Daqing Wan (1993) and later proved by Hendrik Lenstra (1995)

References

Conjectures that have been proved
Polynomials